Center Township is one of twenty townships in Fayette County, Iowa, USA.  As of the 2010 census, its population was 313.

Geography
According to the United States Census Bureau, Center Township covers an area of 36.73 square miles (95.13 square kilometers); of this, 36.69 square miles (95.03 square kilometers, 99.89 percent) is land and 0.04 square miles (0.11 square kilometers, 0.12 percent) is water.

Cities, towns, villages
The town of Randalia is located in Center township. It is the only incorporated community.

Adjacent townships
 Windsor Township (north)
 Union Township (northeast)
 Westfield Township (east)
 Smithfield Township (southeast)
 Harlan Township (south)
 Fremont Township (southwest)
 Banks Township (west)
 Bethel Township (northwest)

Cemeteries
The township contains these three cemeteries: Center Grove, Dunham's Grove and Fayette County Farm.

Major highways
  Iowa Highway 93

Airports and landing strips
 Hawk Landing Strip

Landmarks
 Twin Bridges County Park (west three-quarters)

School districts
 North Fayette Valley Community School District
 West Central Community School District

Political districts
 Iowa's 1st congressional district
 State House District 18
 State Senate District 9

References
 United States Census Bureau 2008 TIGER/Line Shapefiles
 United States Board on Geographic Names (GNIS)
 United States National Atlas

External links
 US-Counties.com
 City-Data.com

Townships in Fayette County, Iowa
Townships in Iowa